John Mayer (born 1977) is an American singer-songwriter and guitarist.

John Mayer may also refer to:
John Mayer (composer) (1930–2004), Indian violinist
John D. Mayer, American psychologist

See also
John Meyer (disambiguation)
John Meier (disambiguation)
John Maher (disambiguation)
John Mayor (disambiguation)